This was the first edition of the tournament.

Clara Tauson won the title, defeating Katharina Hobgarski in the final, 4–6, 6–3, 6–1.

Seeds

Draw

Finals

Top half

Bottom half

References

Main Draw

Meitar Open - Singles